The St. Louis Kid is a 1934 drama film directed by Ray Enright and starring James Cagney.

Plot
A truck driver gets mixed up in a union dispute after a union leader is killed and his girlfriend is kidnapped after witnessing the crime.

Cast

External links
 

1934 films
1934 drama films
American drama films
American black-and-white films
1930s English-language films
Films directed by Ray Enright
Films produced by Samuel Bischoff
1930s American films
Films scored by Bernhard Kaun
Trucker films
Films about kidnapping